

Max Lemke (7 April 1895 – 29 May 1985) was a German Generalmajor in the Wehrmacht during World War II, the last commander of the Fallschirm-Panzer-Division 1 „Hermann Göring“ and a recipient of the Knight's Cross of the Iron Cross of Nazi Germany. He was a POW from 12 May 1945 until 18 June 1945. After the war he was an active member of the "Ordensgemeinschaft der Ritterkreuzträger" (Association of Knight's Cross Recipients).

Awards and decorations
 Iron Cross (1914) 2nd and 1st Class
 The Honour Cross of the World War 1914/1918
 Sudetenland Medal
 Iron Cross (1939) 2nd and 1st Class
 Eastern Front Medal, 1942
 Knight's Cross of the Iron Cross on 18 October 1941 as Major and commander of Aufklärungs-Abteilung 17
 German Cross in Gold on 23 June 1942 as Major and commander of Aufklärungs-Abteilung 17

Notes

References

 

1895 births
1985 deaths
People from Schwedt
People from the Province of Brandenburg
Major generals of the German Army (Wehrmacht)
German Army personnel of World War I
German prisoners of war in World War II
Recipients of the clasp to the Iron Cross, 1st class
Recipients of the Gold German Cross
Recipients of the Knight's Cross of the Iron Cross
Military personnel from Brandenburg
Fallschirmjäger of World War II
German Army generals of World War II